The Interurban Transit Partnership operates a public transit system called The Rapid, which provides bus service to the Grand Rapids, Michigan metropolitan area and beyond. The Rapid was recognized in 2004 and 2013 by receipt from the American Public Transportation Association of an "Outstanding Public Transportation System Award".

Formed by the City of Grand Rapids in 1963 as the Grand Rapids Transit Authority, the system became a regional authority in July 1978 and was renamed the Grand Rapids Area Transit Authority, or GRATA. In January 2000, it reorganized as the Interurban Transit Authority, and soon adopted "The Rapid" as its branding.

Branding 
In September 2006, The Rapid unveiled a new look for the buses to match the design of the Central Station platform which opened in 2004. The older red, blue and yellow striped buses were replaced over the following eleven years with the new design, which features waves of white and blue.

A new website was launched shortly after the new buses were introduced. New features of the website include e-mail updates by route as well as other services, and the ability to buy passes online.

Service area 
Aside from the City of Grand Rapids, the system also serves the cities of East Grand Rapids, Grandville, Kentwood, Walker, and Wyoming. Some routes extend into neighboring townships including Alpine Township (route 9), Byron Township (route 1), and Gaines Township (route 4).

Services 
The Rapid operates 23 fixed bus routes, and special services for Grand Valley State University, Grand Rapids Community College and Ferris State University (see below).

Rapid Central Station 

Address: 250 Grandville Ave SW
Coordinates:
Facilities: Opened in June 2004, the transit center is the main downtown hub for the transit system. The facility is also used by Greyhound Lines and Indian Trails for bus services to destinations outside the city. The Rapid Central Station is the first LEED-NC certified building in the United States in the market of Mass Transit. More information is available at the U.S. Green Building Council of West Michigan page on the bus line's Central Station. Charlesbrook Protection Services is currently contracted as uniform security for the Central Station. As of October 27, 2014, the new Grand Rapids Amtrak station offers inter-modal transit connections, lying immediately south of the bus station.

Bus rapid transit

Silver Line 

Silver Line. a  Bus Rapid Transit (BRT) line, was approved by voters in May 2012. On October 18, 2012, Federal Transit Administration Peter Rogoff visited The Rapid Central Station to sign a project construction grant agreement. Silver Line is the first bus rapid transit (BRT) line in the state of Michigan. The line runs from Central Station, loops downtown via the Medical Mile on Michigan Street and serves Division Avenue from Wealthy Street all the way to 60th Street where it terminates. The Silver Line had budgeted costs of $40 Million. $32 Million was covered by the Federal Transit Administration with the rest funded by the Michigan Department of Transportation (MDOT). Construction started in early 2013, was completed as scheduled during the middle of 2014 and was under budget by over $3 million. The Silver Line began service on August 25, 2014.

Laker Line 
Laker Line is a  BRT line designed to ferry Grand Valley State University students between its main campus located in Allendale and Pew Campus in downtown Grand Rapids. The Rapid was awarded a $600,000 grant to study the feasibility of implementing BRT along the Lake Michigan Avenue corridor spanning the cities of Allendale, Walker, and Grand Rapids. Planners expected to have Laker Line operational by August 2020. Funding came from both federal and state sources. 14 stations make up the line with 13 buses. Capital cost expected was $45.5 million which includes buses and stations. The expected annual operating cost is $3.8 million.

From August 31, 2015, the standard bus route 50 – planned to be replaced by the Laker Line – changed its routing to follow the proposed BRT route as far as the Cook-DeVos Center for Health Sciences on Michigan/Lafayette. Construction on the new line began in 2019 with the line opening in August 2020.

Routes 
Routes 1 through 16 and 18, along with the Silver Line BRT, stop at Rapid Central Station. The new DASH routing from August 2018 brings the North DASH along Cherry Street with a stop outside the station. Outbound routes connect passengers to the four crosstown routes 19, 24, 28, and 44.

Service times 
Most buses operate seven days a week. Routes 3, 5, 12, 13, 14, 18, 24 and 44 do not operate on Sundays. Routes 17 and 19 only run weekdays. Weekday service is from around 4.30-6am until after 11pm or midnight. Saturday service is between around 6 a.m. - 9 p.m., Sundays are between around 7 a.m. - 6 p.m.

To aid scheduling, some routes "interline". This means that a specific vehicle will serve multiple routes as part of its scheduled run by that driver. For example, on weekdays, route 7 arrives at Central Station and continues as the 15.

During the school year, additional routes are used to serve students in the Grand Rapids Public School (GRPS) district. As of October 2005, there is a GRPS shuttle to after school programs at the downtown David D. Hunting Branch of the YMCA.

Fares 

Single fares are $1.75. Passengers can pay their fare in cash or by using a Wave card, a reloadable smart card. The Rapid ended the sale of paper tickets and passes online, at Rapid Central Station, and on buses in November 2019.

Wave cards are tapped at the reader on the buses or at a Silver Line station to pay fare. The first tap of a Wave card gives a passenger 1 hour and 45 minutes to ride wherever and however they want. Subsequent taps during this time frame do not charge the card.  A transfer time expiration show on the reader after each tap of the Wave card.

Passengers paying in cash or with an existing paper ticket can obtain transfer tickets for use on up to three additional routes over the following two hours. They may not be used on the same route twice. A single fare ticket issued on the BRT can be used as a transfer on other routes.

Children under 42" in height do not pay fare. A yellow stripe on the hand rail by the entrance denotes the height limit.

Contracted Services

DASH 

The Rapid operates two bus routes on behalf of the City of Grand Rapids, called Downtown Area Shuttle, or DASH. The routes are free to all passengers, operating every eight minutes, seven days a weeks.

DASH routes were revamped in 2016 and again in 2018. From September 1 the North DASH straightened its route along Monroe, rather than along Ottawa Avenue. The South route was effectively merged into the West DASH, covering the west side DASH lots, Pearl Street, via Division and Fulton to Ionia covering the Arena South lots, and then south to the Downtown Market and Wealthy Street Silver Line station. Service to the Cook-DeVos Center previously provided by the Hill DASH has long since been replaced by the rerouting route 50 along the planned Laker Line route.

The Silver Line is not subject to fare payment between Central Station and Wealthy Street, effectively making it part of the DASH network.

Grand Valley State University 
All Grand Valley State University students, faculty, and staff can ride the buses for free. All others pay regular fare, except for route 51, which is a free DASH route. As of Summer 2009:
 Route 50 Campus Connector runs Monday-Friday from Kirkhof Center at the Allendale Campus to a bus stop under US-131 at Mount Vernon and Front at the Pew Grand Rapids Campus, and continues via a section of the Silver Line on Monroe and Michigan before terminating at Cook-DeVos Center for Health Sciences.
 Route 37 Off-Campus Apartment Shuttle runs weekdays through the Allendale campus to apartments on Lake Michigan Drive and 48th Ave. This route was broken up to form the new Routes 37 & 48. It previously went on Luce (Pierce St. until Fall 2006).
 Route 48 South Campus Express runs Monday through Thursday and Friday afternoon from Kirkhof Center to the South Apartments near 48th Ave. and Pierce St and back. It was new for Fall 2007.
 Route 85 Weekend Connector runs weekends connecting parts of routes 37 & 48.

Grand Rapids Community College 
Grand Rapids Community College provides route number 60, a shuttle bus connecting the school's main campus with the nearby DeVos campus. Stops are located in front of Sneden Hall at the DeVos campus, and at Fountain and Bostwick at the main campus. The bus is free for GRCC students and employees, and runs Monday through Thursday during the Fall and Winter semesters.

Ferris State University 
Ferris State University contracts with The Rapid of Grand Rapids to provide shuttle bus service from Grand Rapids to Big Rapids. The Rapid has assigned route number 100 entitled "Ferris State Express" for this route. The shuttle bus originates in downtown Grand Rapids at The Rapid's central station located at 250 Grandville Ave. SW. The route to and from Ferris' main campus in Big Rapids includes stops near Kendall College of Art and Design in Grand Rapids and the Cedar Springs Meijer (3700 17 Mile Road). Standard Rapid tickets are not valid on this route, special fares apply.

Additional services 
Other services provided by the ITP include:
Car and Vanpooling Assistance: for carpools, the service matches people who make arrangements based on similar work schedules and travel patterns. For vanpools, employees can use The Rapid minivans to get to work.
County Connection: provides transportation in all of Kent County, Michigan.
GO!Bus: provides transportation for those with disabilities.
PASS: curb-to-curb service. Provides transportation into specific neighborhoods where there is low concentration of bus routes.

Future services 
The Rapid has announced a new vision for new services to be in place by the year 2030. Proposed Services include a downtown streetcar system, Bus Rapid Transit along Lake Michigan Drive, expanded routes to Byron Center and eastern Ottawa County's Georgetown Township and the city of Hudsonville. A regional express bus service is also under consideration that would provide shuttle service from outlying areas into downtown Grand Rapids.

References

External links 
Ride The Rapid (official site)
Interurban Transit Partnership Profile from the National Transit Database
The Rapid Facebook
The Rapid Twitter
The Rapid YouTube
GreenRide Carpooling
City of Grand Rapids DASH
USGB of West Michigan

Bus transportation in Michigan
Transportation in Kent County, Michigan
Transportation in Grand Rapids, Michigan